In mathematics, Schilder's theorem is a generalization of the Laplace method from integrals on  to functional Wiener integration. The theorem is used in the large deviations theory of stochastic processes.  Roughly speaking, out of Schilder's theorem one gets an estimate for the probability that a (scaled-down) sample path of Brownian motion will stray far from the mean path (which is constant with value 0).  This statement is made precise using rate functions.  Schilder's theorem is generalized by the Freidlin–Wentzell theorem for Itō diffusions.

Statement of the theorem
Define the rate function 

 

Application to large deviations on the Wiener measure
Let B be a standard Brownian motion in d-dimensional Euclidean space Rd starting at the origin, 0 ∈ Rd; let W denote the law of B, i.e. classical Wiener measure.  For ε > 0, let Wε denote the law of the rescaled process B.  Then, on the Banach space C0 = C0([0, T]; Rd) of continuous functions   such that , equipped with the supremum norm ||·||∞, the probability measures Wε satisfy the large deviations principle with good rate function I : C0 → R ∪ {+∞} given by

if ω is absolutely continuous, and I(ω) = +∞ otherwise.  In other words, for every open set G ⊆ C0 and every closed set F ⊆ C0,

and

Example
Taking ε = 1/c2, one can use Schilder's theorem to obtain estimates for the probability that a standard Brownian motion B strays further than c from its starting point over the time interval [0, T], i.e. the probability

as c tends to infinity.  Here Bc(0; ||·||∞) denotes the open ball of radius c about the zero function in C0, taken with respect to the supremum norm.  First note that

Since the rate function is continuous on A, Schilder's theorem yields

This result can be heuristically interpreted as saying that, for large  and/or large 

References
  (See theorem 5.2)

Asymptotic analysis
Theorems regarding stochastic processes
Large deviations theory